Asifa Zamani is an Indian scholar of Persian language. She was awarded Padma Shri in 2004 by Government of India for her outstanding work. In 1999 she received 'President of India Certificate of Honor in Persian.

References

External links 

Recipients of the Padma Shri in literature & education
Indian Muslims
People from Uttar Pradesh
Living people
Year of birth missing (living people)